The 2012 Asian Aerobic Gymnastics Championships were the 3rd edition of the Asian Aerobic Gymnastics Championships, and were held in Palembang Sport and Convention Center, Palembang, Indonesia from October 18 to October 19, 2012.

Medal summary

Medal table

Participating nations 
36 athletes from 9 nations competed.

 (3)
 (3)
 (8)
 (7)
 (3)
 (3)
 (3)
 (3)
 (3)

References
 Complete Results

A
Asian Gymnastics Championships
Asian Gymnastics Championships
International gymnastics competitions hosted by Indonesia
Gymnastics competitions in Indonesia